WICU (1310 AM; "Happi Radio") is a radio station broadcasting a contemporary hit radio format. Licensed to Warren, Pennsylvania, United States, the station is a simulcast of Erie-based WICU-FM (92.7); its programming is also heard on translator station W244DY (96.7 FM). WICU is owned by Lilly Broadcasting.

History
The station signed on December 31, 1946 as WNAE. Northern Allegheny Broadcasting sold the station to Kinzua Broadcasting Company in 1974.

Kinzua Broadcasting sold WNAE, along with sister stations WRRN and WKNB, to Frank Iorio, who already owned the construction permit for a station on 102.7 FM in Clarendon, in 2005 for $1.25 million. In 2019, after a failed attempt to sell the stations to Laurel Media two years prior, Iorio (who owned the stations under the name Radio Partners LLC) sold WNAE, WKNB, and WRRN, to Lilly Broadcasting, which operates WICU-TV and WSEE-TV in Erie, Pennsylvania, for $900,000. The call sign was changed to WICU on March 4, 2020, matching WICU-TV and WICU-FM in Erie; the change was a prelude to the replacement of WNAE's former talk radio format with a simulcast of WICU-FM's contemporary hit radio programming on April 1. The WNAE call sign was concurrently transferred to the former WKNB.

References

External links

ICU (AM)
Contemporary hit radio stations in the United States
Radio stations established in 1946
1946 establishments in Pennsylvania